Gainsbourg Percussions is the sixth studio album by French musician Serge Gainsbourg, released in 1964. Gainsbourg reinvents his style with Latin, African, and Cuban influences. It would be his last album before 1968.

Track listing

"Joanna" is an uncredited cover of Babatunde Olatunji's "Kiyakiya (Why Do You Run Away?)" from Drums of Passion LP (1959)
"New York U.S.A." is an uncredited cover of Babatunde Olatunji's "Akiwowo (Chant to the Trainman)" from Drums Of Passion (1959)
"Marabout" is an uncredited cover of Babatunde Olatunji's "Gin-Go-Lo-Ba (Drums of Passion)" from Drums Of Passion LP (1959)
"Pauvre Lola" contains an uncredited sample of Miriam Makeba's "Umqokozo (Children's Game Song About a New Red Dress)" from The Many Voices of Miriam Makeba LP (1962)

Personnel
Credits adapted from liner notes.

Musicians
 Serge Gainsbourg - vocals
 Alain Goraguer – musical direction, arrangements, orchestra conductor, piano
 Christian Garros – drums
 André Arpino – drums
 Armand Molinetti – drums
 Michel Gaudry – double bass
 Michel Portal – tenor saxophone, soprano saxophone
 Eddy Louiss – organ
 France Gall – "laughs" (track 3, uncredited)
 Background vocals and percussions are by unidentified personnel

Technical
 Claude Dejacques – production
 Roger Roche – sound engineering
 Jacques Aubert – cover art
 Jean-Pierre Haie – remastering (remastered edition)
 Jean-Marie Guérin – remastering (remastered edition)

References

External links 
 
 

1964 albums
French-language albums
Serge Gainsbourg albums
Philips Records albums